Primrose is an unincorporated community in Lee County, Kentucky, United States. Its post office opened in 1893.

References

Unincorporated communities in Lee County, Kentucky
Unincorporated communities in Kentucky